Love Play is a 1961 French film starring Jean Seberg. It was directed by Seberg's then husband Francois Moreuil.

It was also known as La récréation or Playtime.

It was based on a short story by Francois Sagan.

Cast
Jean Seberg as Kate Hoover
Christian Marquand as Philippe
Françoise Prévost as Anne de Limeuil
Evelyne Ker

References

External links

1961 films
French drama films
1960s French-language films
Films based on works by Françoise Sagan
1960s French films